No Regret Peak, at  above sea level, is the eleventh-highest peak in the U.S. state of Idaho and the ninth-highest in the Lost River Range. The peak is located in Salmon-Challis National Forest in Custer County.

See also
 Little Regret Peak
 List of mountain peaks of Idaho

References 

Mountains of Custer County, Idaho
Mountains of Idaho
Salmon-Challis National Forest